Azochis euvexalis is a moth in the family Crambidae. It was described by Heinrich Benno Möschler in 1890. It is found on the Virgin Islands and Puerto Rico.

References

Moths described in 1890
Spilomelinae
Moths of the Caribbean